Poimenesperus thomsoni is a species of beetle in the family Cerambycidae. It was described by Francis Polkinghorne Pascoe in 1869. It is known from the Democratic Republic of the Congo, Gabon, Cameroon, and Equatorial Guinea. It feeds on Xylopia aethiopica.

Varietas
 Poimenesperus thomsoni var. strandi (Breuning, 1934)
 Poimenesperus thomsoni var. reductus Breuning, 1939
 Poimenesperus thomsoni var. alboreductus Breuning, 1950
 Poimenesperus thomsoni var. taeniatus Jordan, 1894
 Poimenesperus thomsoni var. nubilus Breuning, 1934

References

thomsoni
Beetles described in 1869